WDET-FM (101.9 MHz) is a public radio station in Detroit, Michigan.  It is owned by Wayne State University with its studios and transmitter in the Cass Corridor neighborhood.  WDET broadcasts shows from National Public Radio, Public Radio International and American Public Media. The station is the primary provider of news involving the American automotive industry. and the Michigan Association of Broadcasters (MAB) named WDET the 2021 Public Radio Station of the Year.

WDET-FM has an effective radiated power (ERP) of 48,000 watts.  It is licensed to broadcast using HD Radio technology.   WDET-FM's signal covers much of Southeast Michigan and part of Southwestern Ontario.

Programming
On weekdays, WDET-FM airs news and talk programming, mostly national shows with local news cut-ins: Morning Edition, All Things Considered, Fresh Air, 1A, On Point and Marketplace. It also produces a weekday local one-hour interview program, Detroit Today with Stephen Henderson, airing at 9 a.m. and repeated at 7 p.m.  

On weekends, a mix of talk shows and music programs are heard.  Talk shows include Wait Wait... Don't Tell Me!, The Moth Radio Hour, Hidden Brain, Radio Lab, On The Media, Snap Judgment and Latino USA.  Music programs include Acoustic Café, Ann Delisi's Essential Music, Rob Reinhart's Essential Music, Soul Saturday, This Island Earth with Ismael Ahmed, The Progressive Underground with Chris Campbell, Destination Jazz with Ed Love and Jay's Place with Jay Butler.  (Butler was a longtime air personality on WQBH and WJLB.)  

The Detroit Radio Information Service (DRIS) broadcasts on a subcarrier of WDET. DRIS serves the visually impaired community with live and pre-recorded readings of daily and weekly print publications via special radio receiver or streaming.  There are plans to launch an HD-2 subchannel which would play eclectic music and some news programs.

History

United Auto Workers
It was originally owned by the United Auto Workers Union. It mostly broadcast public service programs under station manager Ben Hoberman. The studios were at Radio Plaza. What was then Wayne University (it joined the state university system in 1956) bought the station for one dollar in 1952 and converted it to non-commercial status.  

Through its early years, the public service talk shows continued along with classical music and other genres.  In the 1970s, WDET-FM began adding shows from the new public radio network, NPR, including All Things Considered and Morning Edition.  Over time, music shows were reduced, while news and talk programming increased.

Increasing local content
In 2004, WDET-FM implemented extensive programming changes. The station dropped many NPR programs such as Fresh Air and Car Talk, as well as some popular local music shows such as Folks Like Us and Arkansas Traveler.  This was done to promote more locally produced music programming.  However, it was followed by a decline in listener pledges. 

In the fall of 2005, new general manager Michael Coleman (replacing Caryn Mathes, who departed for WAMU in Washington, D.C.) made changes to WDET's schedule again, dropping many of the weekday music programs in favor of a more news-oriented format.  He brought back all of the previously dropped programming and added new NPR-produced programs. Particularly controversial was the dismissal of long-time midday host Martin Bandyke.  Local media outlets reported he may have violated conflict of interest rules by accepting gifts from record companies.  Bandyke later hosted morning drive time at Adult Alternative-formatted WQKL 107.1 FM in Ann Arbor.

Controversy over changes
As a result of the 2005 format change, some listeners filed a class action lawsuit against the station for fraudulently taking donations for programming that was planned on being discontinued. Disgruntled former listeners also held two protests. The first occurred in front of WDET's offices a few days after Christmas. The second occurred near Cobo Hall during the North American International Auto Show. 

Organizers promised that the rally would draw 5,000 people, though less than one hundred showed up, and a plan to protest WDET's changes during the Super Bowl XL festivities also failed to occur.

On Thursday May 11, 2006, Michael Coleman announced another major shake-up at WDET. Six employees were laid off including long-time music host Jon Moshier. Several others were forced to accept pay cuts, demotions, or reductions in hours.

2007 Programming changes
On Monday April 2, 2007, WDET implemented several programming changes. The following programs were removed from the schedule: "Day to Day" (which was terminated by NPR, not WDET), "Front Row Center," "Live From Studio A," "The Best of the DSO," Liz Copeland's "Alternate Take," Chuck Horn's "Seventh Journey," "The Ralph Valdez program," Mick Collin's "Night Train," and "The W. Kim Heron Program." New additions included the locally produced "Detroit Today" as well as NPR programs "Talk of the Nation," "Marketplace," "Marketplace Money," "BBC World Service," "Wait Wait... Don't Tell Me!," and "The Changing World." "Destination Jazz: The Ed Love Program" was reduced from five to three hours, and Michael Julien's "Global Mix" was reduced from five to two hours. Combined with previous changes, the station moved to a more news oriented format. WDET now has less local and indie music coverage, although the station continues to offer several musical genres on weekends.

On September 15, 2007, WDET added the show "Tell Me More" with Michel Martin from NPR News on weekdays at 1 pm, which replaced "World Have Your Say" from the BBC. "Deep River" with Robert Jones moved to Sunday afternoons, and "The Tavis Smiley Show" was added to the weekend line up, on Friday evenings and Sunday mornings.

Broadcast transmitter
WDET transmits from a tower at 554 feet (169 meters) in height above average terrain (HAAT) near the intersection of Cass Avenue and Canfield Street near the Wayne State University campus.  WDET broadcasts with an effective radiated power (ERP) of 48,000 watts, so it is grandfathered at slightly more power than would be permitted today in the Detroit area, for its HAAT.

References

External links

 WDET Program Guides and Reports at the Walter P. Reuther Library spanning 1951–2002.

DET-FM
Wayne State University
United Auto Workers
1948 establishments in Michigan
NPR member stations
Radio stations established in 1948
DET-FM